Forest District could refer to:

Australia
 Forest District (Sydney)

United Kingdom
 Epping Forest (district)
 New Forest (district)
 Wyre Forest (district)
 Forest of Dean (district)
 Forest District, a former London bus district

United States
 Forest Preserve District of DuPage County
 Cook County Forest Preserves
 North Forest Independent School District
 Lake Forest School District
 Forest City Regional School District
 Forest Municipal School District
 Forest Grove School District (Oklahoma)
 Forest Grove School District (Oregon)
 Forest Hill Historic District (disambiguation)
 Forest Hills Local School District